Lemasters Bluff is a rock bluff at the eastern extremity of the Lichen Hills in Victoria Land, Antarctica. It was mapped by the United States Geological Survey from surveys and U.S. Navy air photos, 1960–64, and was named by the Advisory Committee on Antarctic Names for Lieutenant Max E. Lemasters, U.S. Navy, an air operations officer at McMurdo Station, 1967.

References

Cliffs of Victoria Land
Pennell Coast